Bobuleşti may refer to:

 Bobuleşti, a village in Gura Camencii Commune, Floreşti district, Moldova
 Bobuleşti, a village in Ştefăneşti town, Botoşani County, Romania